A susu or sou-sou or osusu  or asue (also known as a merry-go-round, Partner or Pawdna in Jamaica  sol in Haiti and Njangi in Cameroon) is a form of rotating savings and credit association, a type of informal savings club arrangement between a small group of people who take turns by "throwing hand", as the partners call it. The name is used in Africa (especially West Africa) and the Caribbean. The basic principle is that each member of the group makes a standard contribution to a common fund once per some time period. Then each period the total contributions are disbursed to a single member of the group. The recipient changes each period in a rotating fashion such that all the members of the group are eventually recipients. Participants of a susu do not make a profit, but receive their contributions as a lump sum and is a forms of savings clubs.

Overview
A member who receives a distribution early on effectively receives a loan. They collect a larger sum of money early and "repay" as they make contributions going forward. A member who receives a distribution toward the end of a rotation has effectively been "saving" their contributions leading up to the disbursal.

Traditionally the arrangement is conducted in cash and without any interest charged. The organizer of the sou-sou may be compensated for their efforts as a courtesy. Since a sou-sou is not a written or legal contract it relies on personal trust to discourage malfeasance. For this reason it is more likely that the participants are members of the same community and know each other.

The concept of a susu is used throughout the world and has over 200 different names that vary from country to country. The funds are generally gathered with a set amount contributed from family or friends each week. An estimated three quarters of Caribbean immigrants in New York participated in susus during the 1980s.

Susu scams 
Scammers have set up pyramid schemes which imitate or pretend to be susus. In contrast to traditional susus (in which participants only receive the money they put in without profit), these schemes promise a profit. Additionally, these scheme promise rewards for recruiting more people to the susu, in effect making it a pyramid scheme. These fake susu scams (also known as "blessing loom" or "gifting circle.") have increased during the 2020 COVID pandemic, and are often targeted to African-Americans under the guise of being the traditional African and Caribbean practice.

See also
Susu account
Tanda, the Latin American version of the system
Rotating savings and credit association
Hui (informal loan club)

References

External links 
Sou-sou: Black immigrants bring savings clubs Stateside
Sou-sou: Africa savings pool scheme in America
FTC article on differentiating real susus from scams

Rotating savings and credit association
Microfinance in North America
Microfinance in Africa
Informal economy in North America
Informal economy in Africa
Economy of the Caribbean
Financial services in Ghana
Afro-Caribbean culture